The Songs of Leonard Cohen Covered is a tribute album to Leonard Cohen, released in 2012. It was compiled by Mojo magazine, as a part of the magazine's March 2012 issue. The album features contributions by various musicians, including Bill Callahan, Cass McCombs, The Low Anthem, Field Music, Marc Ribot and ex-Fleet Foxes member Father John Misty.

Track listing
 Field Music – "Suzanne"	
 Emily Barker and The Red Clay Halo – "Master Song"	
 Palace Songs – "Winter Lady"	
 The Miserable Rich – "The Stranger Song"	
 Liz Green – "Sisters of Mercy"	
 Bill Callahan – "So Long, Marianne"	
 Michael Kiwanuka – "Hey, That's No Way To Say Goodbye"
 The Low Anthem – "Stories of the Street"	
 Cass McCombs – "Teachers"	
 Father John Misty – "One of Us Cannot Be Wrong"	
Bonus tracks
Diagrams – "Famous Blue Raincoat"
Paper Dollhouse – "Last Year's Man"
Marc Ribot and My Brightest Diamond – "Bird on A Wire"
Dan Michaelson – "Avalanche"
Scott Matthews – "Seems So Long Ago, Nancy"

Personnel
Additional musicians
Brian Beattie – bass guitar (6)
Dony Wynn – drums (6)
Matt Kinsey – electric guitar (6)
Gary Newcomb – lap steel guitar (6)
John Perreira – electric guitar (9)
John Webster Johns – electric guitar, production (9)

References

External links
 

Leonard Cohen tribute albums
2012 compilation albums
Folk rock compilation albums
Compilation albums included with magazines